Rock Lake is a lake in Alberta. It lies in extreme western Yellowhead County.

Rock Lake
Yellowhead County